Henri Desfontaines (12 November 1876, Paris – 7 January 1931, Paris) was a French film director, actor, and scriptwriter.

Filmography

As director 
 1908 : Hamlet
 1909 : Le Puits et le pendule
 1910 : Un invité gênant
 1910 : Shylock, le marchand de Venise (Shylock)
 1910 : Le Scarabée d'or
 1910 : Résurrection
 1910 : La Main verte
 1910 : Hop-Frog
 1910 : Le Gendre ingénieux
 1911 : Oliver Cromwell
 1911 : La Momie
 1911 : Milton
 1911 : La Mègère apprivoisée
 1911 : Jésus de Nazareth
 1911 : La Femme-cochère
 1911 : L'Assassinat d'Henri III
 1911 : Falstaff
 1911 : Madame Sans-Gêne
 1912 : Vaincre ou mourir
 1912 : Le Page
 1912 : La Chambre au judas
 1912 : La Reine Élisabeth (Les Amours de la reine Élisabeth)
 1913 : Sublime amour
 1913 : L'Homme nu
 1913 : La Carabine de la mort
 1913 : Anne de Boleyn
 1913 : Adrienne Lecouvreur
 1913 : Le Secret de Polichinelle
 1914 : Les Yeux du cœur
 1914 : Le Téléphone qui accuse
 1914 : La Reine Margot
 1914 : Monsieur Vautour
 1914 : Le Médecin des pauvres
 1915 : Nouvelle aurore
 1916 : La Forêt qui écoute
 1916 : Le Dernier rêve
 1916 : Chouchou
 1917 : Un vol étrange
 1917 : Pour l'Alsace
 1918 : Pendant la guerre
 1918 : Les Enfants de France et de la guerre
 1918 : Les Bleus de l'amour
 1919 : La Suprême épopée
 1919 : Sa gosse
 1920 : La Marseillaise
 1920 : Autour du mystère
 1921 : 
 1921 : Chichinette et Cie
 1922 : Son altesse
 1922 : La Fille des chiffonniers
 1923 : Madame Flirt
 1923 : L'Insigne mystérieux
 1923 : L'Espionne
 1924 : 
 1924 : Vers Abecher la mystérieuse
 1925 : L'Espionne aux yeux noirs
 1926 : Captain Rascasse
 1927 : Poker d'as
 1927 : Belphégor
 1928 : Le Film du poilu

As actor 
 1908 : Hamlet
 1908 : Don Juan
 1908 : L'Arlésienne
 1908 : L'Homme aux gants blancs : L'homme aux gants blancs
 1909 : Une corderie
 1909 : La Princesse Tarakanowa et Catherine II (Tarakanowa et Catherine II)
 1909 : Le Roi de Rome
 1909 : La Peur
 1909 : La Peau de chagrin
 1909 : La Fin de Lincoln (La Mort de Lincoln)
 1909 : L'Héritage de Zouzou
 1909 : Héliogabale
 1909 : Fleur de pavé
 1909 : La Dernière conquête
 1909 : Le Roman d'une jeune fille pauvre
 1909 : Pauvre gosse
 1910 : Sous la terreur
 1910 : L'Orgueil
 1911 : Le Roman d'une pauvre fille
 1911 : Jéus de Nazareth
 1911 : Camille Desmoulins
 1911 : L'Assassinat d'Henri III
 1912 : Antar
 1912 : Les Amours de la reine Élisabeth (1912)
 1912 : La Dame aux camélias
 1914 : Le Secret du châtelain
 1914 : La Reine Margot
 1916 : La Forêt qui écoute
 1916 : La Faute de Pierre Vaisy
 1916 : Soupçon tragique : Le chef de la sûreté
 1918 : L'Obstacle
 1919 : Sa gosse
 1920 : Autour du mystère
 1930 : La Maison de la flèche : Bex
 1931 : The Eaglet : Metternich

As scriptwriter 
 1914 : Les Yeux du cœur
 1914 : Le Téléphone qui accuse
 1920 : Autour du mystère

External links 

1876 births
1931 deaths
French male film actors
French male silent film actors
French male screenwriters
20th-century French screenwriters
French film directors
Male actors from Paris
20th-century French male actors
20th-century French male writers